Michael Lent may refer to:
 Michael Lent (visual artist) 
 Michael Lent (writer and producer)